33 Canadian Brigade Group of the Canadian Army is part of 4th Canadian Division. It commands the Primary Reserve units in eastern and northern portions of Ontario. It was established in 1997.

Brigade units

References 

Brigades of the Canadian Army
Organizations based in Ottawa
Military units and formations established in 1997